"How I Feel" is a song by American rapper Flo Rida. It samples the song "Feeling Good" by Nina Simone. The song peaked at number twenty-six on the ARIA and number fifty-five on the Canadian Hot 100.

Flo Rida performed the song on the 13 episode of fifth season of The Voice with judge Christina Aguilera singing the chorus. This is the official theme song of the 27th Annual WWE Survivor Series The song was also used to promote the 13th season of American Idol.

Music video
Directed by Shane Drake, the video features Flo Rida and his friends (dressed in Rat Pack-inspired wardrobe) going to Planet Hollywood Resort & Casino in Las Vegas. At some points, the action freezes and the camera zooms in on the action that happens in tableau. The video was uploaded on YouTube on November 14, 2013.

Track listing
 Digital download
 "How I Feel" – 2:49

Remixes
 Digital Downloads
 "How I Feel" (SICK INDIVIDUALS Remix) - 3:24
 "How I Feel" (SCNDL Remix) - 3:20
 "How I Feel" (Special Future Remix) - 5:42
 "How I Feel" (Wolfpack Remix) - 5:24 
 "How I Feel" (Twenty1 Remix) - 3:21
 "How I Feel" (Bang La Decks Remix) - 5:00

Chart performance

Certifications

Release history

References

2013 singles
Flo Rida songs
Song recordings produced by DJ Frank E
Music videos directed by Shane Drake
Songs written by Flo Rida
2013 songs